The list of University of Kansas people includes notable alumni and faculty of the University of Kansas, whose main campus is located in the American city of Lawrence, Kansas.

Alumni

Nobel laureates 
 Frank Rowland (1956–64), awarded the 1995 Nobel Prize in Chemistry
 Vernon Smith (M.A. in economics 1952), awarded the 2002 Nobel Memorial Prize in Economics
 Juan Manuel Santos, Former President of Colombia, elected in 2010; Nobel Peace Prize winner (2016)

Politics, government and education

Media and the arts

Science and technology

Business

Honorary alumni 
 Donald J. Hall, Sr., chairman of the board and former president and CEO of Hallmark Cards
 Chester Nez, WWII veteran and the member of the 29 Navajo Code Talkers

Faculty

Athletes and coaches

Baseball

Basketball
 and 2022 NBA Champion

Football

Golf
 Matt Gogel, professional golfer on the PGA Tour; winner of the 2002 AT&T Pebble Beach National Pro-Am on the PGA Tour
 Gary Woodland, professional golfer on the PGA Tour; winner of the 2011 Transitions Championship at Innisbrook, the 2013 Reno Tahoe Open, the 2018 Waste Management Phoenix Open on the PGA Tour, and the 2019 U.S. Open

Soccer

Track and field

Athletic directors
 Kent Weiser, retired athletic director at Emporia State University; former women's golf coach at Kansas
 Travis Goff, athletics director at the University of Kansas

See also

 List of people from Lawrence, Kansas
 Lists of people from Kansas

References 

University of Kansas people